James Harvey Blood (December 29, 1833 – December 29, 1885) was a Commander of the 6th Missouri Volunteer Infantry in the Union Army during the American Civil War. He was promoted from lieutenant colonel to colonel, and he was elected city auditor of St. Louis. He was the second husband of Victoria Woodhull, the 19th-century suffragist and activist who was the first woman to run as a candidate for president of the United States.

Marriage to Victoria Woodhull 
In April 1864, Victoria Claflin Woodhull was billing herself as a "spiritualistic physician" in St. Louis, Missouri. In the first session with Blood, she predicted their marriage, and he promptly proposed even though he was still married to his first wife, Mary Ann Clapp Harrington. Woodhull also was married at the time, and once both divorces were complete, the couple left St. Louis in 1865, moving through Midwestern cities before reaching New York City in 1867. Woodhull, in denouncing the crusades that had provided her with national attention, abandoned Blood in 1876 to try to regain her respectability. His only public response was "The grandest woman in the world went back on me." They divorced later that year.

Later life 
Blood later married his third wife, Isabell Morrill Fogg, after divorcing Woodhull in 1876. He died in Akanten, Gold Coast, Africa while on a gold mining expedition, where he had struck gold. He died on his 52nd birthday.

References

External links
Colonel Blood & The Fogg Women, Victoria-Woodhull Website

1833 births
1885 deaths
People from Dudley, Massachusetts
Politicians from St. Louis
Union Army colonels
People of Missouri in the American Civil War
19th-century American politicians
American expatriates in Gold Coast Colony
Military personnel from Massachusetts